Cromer is a surname. Notable people with the surname include:

D. T. Cromer, (born 1971), American former baseball player
David Cromer, American stage actor and theatre director
Don T. Cromer, American radiation physicist, Ernest Orlando Lawrence Award laureate
George Cromer (died 1543), Archbishop of Armagh and Primate of All Ireland
George W. Cromer (1856–1936), U.S. Representative from Indiana
Giulio Cromer (died 1632), an Italian painter
Greg Cromer (born 1958), American politician
Ronnie W. Cromer (born 1947), Republican member of the South Carolina Senate
Tripp Cromer (born 1967), former American Major League baseball player
Walter Cromer (fl. 1543), Scottish doctor